Schreibersite is generally a rare iron nickel phosphide mineral, though common in iron-nickel meteorites. It has been found on Disko Island in Greenland and Illinois.

Another name used for the mineral is rhabdite. It forms tetragonal crystals with perfect 001 cleavage. Its color ranges from bronze to brass yellow to silver white. It has a density of 7.5 and a hardness of 6.5 – 7. It is opaque with a metallic luster and a dark gray streak. It was named after the Austrian scientist Carl Franz Anton Ritter von Schreibers (1775–1852), who was one of the first to describe it from iron meteorites.

Schreibersite is reported from the Magura Meteorite, Arva-(present name – Orava), Slovak Republic; the Sikhote-Alin Meteorite in eastern Russia; the São Julião de Moreira Meteorite, Viana do Castelo, Portugal; the Gebel Kamil (meteorite) in Egypt; and numerous other locations including the Moon.

In 2007, researchers reported that schreibersite and other meteoric phosphorus bearing minerals may be the ultimate source for the phosphorus that is so important for life on Earth.  In 2013, researchers reported that they had successfully produced pyrophosphite, a possible precursor to pyrophosphate, the molecule associated with ATP, a co-enzyme central to energy metabolism in all life on Earth.  Their experiment consisted of subjecting a sample of schreibersite to a warm, acidic environment typically found in association with volcanic activity, activity that was far more common on the primordial Earth.  They hypothesized that their experiment might represent what they termed "chemical life", a stage of evolution which may have led to the emergence of fully biological life as exists today.

In 1986 researchers found lightning can create schreibersite and may have been the source of phosphorus for early life.

See also
 Glossary of meteoritics
List of minerals
List of minerals named after people

References

External links

Iron minerals
Nickel minerals
Phosphide minerals
Meteorite minerals
Tetragonal minerals
Minerals in space group 82
Disko Island
Native element minerals